1305 Phongolo, provisional designation , is a background asteroid from the outer regions of the asteroid belt, approximately 25 kilometers in diameter. It was discovered on 19 July 1928, by English astronomer Harry Edwin Wood at the Union Observatory in Johannesburg, South Africa. The asteroid was named for the South African Pongola River.

Orbit and classification 

Phongolo is a non-family asteroid from the main belt's background population. It orbits the Sun in the outer asteroid belt at a distance of 2.8–3.2 AU once every 5 years and 3 months (1,910 days; semi-major axis of 3.01 AU). Its orbit has an eccentricity of 0.07 and an inclination of 2° with respect to the ecliptic.

Physical characteristics 

Phongolo is a suspected carbonaceous C-type asteroid. The space-based survey gave an albedo (see below) that is not in-line with a carbonaceous spectral type.

Rotation period 

Several rotational lightcurve of Phongolo have been obtained from photometric observations since 1984. Analysis of the best-rated lightcurve gave a rotation period of 8.335 hours and a consolidated brightness amplitude between 0.14 and 0.19 magnitude.

Diameter and albedo 

According to the surveys carried out by the Japanese Akari satellite and the NEOWISE mission of NASA's Wide-field Infrared Survey Explorer, Pongola measures between 24.110 and 25.124 kilometers in diameter and its surface has an albedo between 0.157 and 0.169.

The Collaborative Asteroid Lightcurve Link assumes a much lower standard albedo for carbonaceous asteroids of 0.057 and consequently derives a much larger diameter of 41.45 kilometers based on an absolute magnitude of 10.64.

Naming 

This minor planet was named by the discoverer after the Phongolo River (Phongolo; Pongolarivier) in KwaZulu-Natal, South Africa. The official naming citation was mentioned in The Names of the Minor Planets by Paul Herget in 1955.

References

External links 
 Asteroid Lightcurve Database (LCDB), query form (info )
 Dictionary of Minor Planet Names, Google books
 Asteroids and comets rotation curves, CdR – Observatoire de Genève, Raoul Behrend
 Discovery Circumstances: Numbered Minor Planets (1)-(5000) – Minor Planet Center
 
 

001305
Discoveries by Harry Edwin Wood
Named minor planets
19280719